Francisco José Arnáiz Zarandona (March 9, 1925 – February 14, 2014) was a Catholic bishop.

Born in Spain, Arnáiz Zarandona was ordained to the priest hold for the Society of Jesus in 1955. In 1988, Aráiz Zarandona was named auxiliary bishop of Leges and auxiliary bishop of the Archdiocese of Santo Domingo, Dominican Republic. He retired in 2002.

Notes

1925 births
2014 deaths
20th-century Spanish Jesuits
20th-century Roman Catholic bishops in the Dominican Republic
Spanish Roman Catholic bishops in North America
Spanish expatriates in the Dominican Republic
21st-century Roman Catholic bishops in the Dominican Republic
Roman Catholic bishops of Santo Domingo